Cheromettia ferruginea is a moth of the family Limacodidae first described by Frederic Moore in 1877. It is found in Sri Lanka.

Larval host plant is Coffea species.

References

Moths of Asia
Moths described in 1877
Limacodidae